Witold Stanisław Baran (29 July 1939 – 22 June 2020) was a middle distance runner from Poland. He was born in Chmielów.  Set a European mile record of 3 minutes 56.04 sec finishing first at the White City, London on 3 August 1964. He finished sixth in the 1500 metres final at the 1964 Summer Olympics in Tokyo, Japan.

References
 Profile Sporting Heroes
 Profile Bieganie.pl
 Witold Baran's obituary 
YouTube 

1939 births
2020 deaths
Burials in Municipal Cemeteries in Bydgoszcz
Polish male middle-distance runners
Athletes (track and field) at the 1964 Summer Olympics
Olympic athletes of Poland
People from Ostrowiec County
European Athletics Championships medalists
Sportspeople from Świętokrzyskie Voivodeship
Zawisza Bydgoszcz athletes
20th-century Polish people